Holmboe is a Norwegian family which originated at Hirsholmene in  Jutland, Denmark. It was introduced into Norway with the arrival  of brothers Jens Olsøn Holmboe (1671–1743)  and Hans Olsøn Holmboe (1685–1762). Jens Olsen Holmboe was a senior priest who arrived at Vardal during 1705. Hans Olsen Holmboe was a  senior military officer  who came to Norway during 1716.

Family tree
The family trees are not meant to be complete. It lists only the notable individuals of this family, as well as their ancestors.

Jens Holmboe line
Below is a family tree that branches off from ancestor Jens Holmboe, bailiff (fogd) in Senja and Troms .

Otto Holmboe line
Below is a family tree that branches off from ancestor  Otto Holmboe, provost (stiftsprost)  at Christiania.

In addition, Arnold Holmboe (1873–1956) was a great-great-grandchild of Otto's first cousin.

References

Literature
 Hans Cappelen: Norske Slektsvåpen (Norwegian Family Coats of Arms) with an English Summary, Oslo 1969, p. 128

Norwegian families